The Santa Rosa Monastery, located in Arequipa (Peru), is a religious complex that houses a community of cloistered Dominican nuns. It was founded in 1740 by a group of nuns from its "mother monastery" that of Santa Catalina de Siena, located in the same city. It is dedicated to the memory of St. Rose of Lima.

It is part of the UNESCO World Heritage Site Historic Center of the City of Arequipa.

Location
Originally it was planned to be built in Moquegua, but it was finally built in the historic center of Arequipa, on the corner of Santa Rosa Passage and San Pedro Street, on the edge of the city's checkerboard, behind Plaza España.

Architecture
Since its construction, this monastery was smaller than the other two that are located in the city, that of Santa Catalina and the Monastery of Santa Teresa. It is reputed to be the poorest of the three monasteries, because they never owned a large amount of property or agricultural land.

Like other churches in the city, the Monastery is built with tuff of white volcanic stone and calicanto. The main entrance has a tower and its bell tower and a portal of carved tuff, located on San Pedro street. This door allows access to the main nave where mass is celebrated. On the side of the Santa Rosa passage, there is access to a courtyard, which also has a carved portal, as well as a shop where traditional sweets made by the nuns are offered.

History
The monastery was built thanks to the financing of Don José Alcázar y Padilla and Doña María Peñaloza, who in their wills donated the basics to found the monastery, which was originally going to be built in the city of Moquegua. In 1734, the bishop of Arequipa, Juan Cavero de Toledo, obtained a real cédula from Philip V of Spain, for the operation of the monastery. The real cédula was ratified in 1736, and in 1740 it was established that it be founded in Arequipa, with the condition that preference be given to girls and women from the town of Moquegua, given that this was going to be the original place to establish the closure.

Construction began with the laying of the first stone by Monsignor Juan Bravo de Ribero, Bishop of Arequipa. The work concluded on June 12, 1747 and the following day a group of nuns moved from Santa Catalina to found the Monastery of Santa Rosa. On 1752, Juan Bravo de Ribero was buried in the prebistery of the monastery of Santa Rosa, and his life-size oil-painted portrait exists today in the presbistery.

In 1843, the Regenerative Revolution broke out in Arequipa, led by Manuel Ignacio de Vivanco against the government of Agustín Gamarra. To quell the uprising, Gamarra sent his War Minister Ramón Castilla to fight against Vivanco. The troops of both caudillos barricaded themselves at the ends of what is now Plaza España, while Vivanco's forces entrenched themselves in the tower of the Church of Santa Marta, those of Castilla took the tower of the Monastery of Santa Rosa. The bullets came and went from one side to the other, but in the middle of the battle, they saw a boy who was walking along the walls of the monastery and that made the shooting end. It is said that this child saved the nuns from being injured by the bullets that passed everywhere, thus the devotion to the Child of the Resurrection was born, better known as the "Stubborn Child", which continues to this day.

The Monastery of Santa Rosa was once again the scene of a bloody confrontation between the troops of Vivanco and Castilla, this time in the framework of the Civil War of 1856-1858. At dawn on Sunday, March 7, 1858, the Castilla troops stormed the building, attacking the trench built at the base of the church walls, as well as the temple itself and the vaults of the convent. In the nearby ditch, the blood ran like water, the Immortals boys' column was completely annihilated, counting the dead in number of three thousand. In the battle, those who would later be heroes of the War of the Pacific, Colonel Francisco Bolognesi and Marshal Andrés Avelino Cáceres, were wounded.

Devotions of the Monastery
Stubborn Child

The Child of the Resurrection, is a devotion born when the troops of Marshal Ramón Castilla took the tower of the Monastery to face the troops of the Regenerating Revolution, and the nuns were saved from the shooting by the Child. The image of the Stubborn Child has its foot on a skull that symbolizes the triumph over death. Every Easter Sunday there is a small procession called la Aurora, where the risen Christ is found with the Virgin Mary. In the procession, the Child goes out through the door that leads to Santa Marta accompanied by all the men present at the mass, while the Virgin does so through the door of the church on San Pedro Street, accompanied by all the ladies present. Both images meet at the intersection of the streets and together, in procession, they return to the temple for the Easter mass. Subsequently, the small image remains on an altar so that the people who went to see it can approach it.

The Lord of la Cena and the Pilgrim Virgin

The Lord of la Cena is venerated in the monastery of Santa Rosa, who is credited with the miracle of allowing mother Toribia to get up from her wheelchair, in which she was bedridden. In this monastery there is also the Virgin of the Rosary, who is called the pilgrim, who was brought by a priest to Arequipa, where he left her for a while and every time he tried to recover her health was affected. The religious understood that the effigy wanted to remain in the monastery and so it was.

See also
List of colonial buildings in Arequipa

References

Roman Catholic churches in Arequipa
Roman Catholic churches completed in 1747
1740 establishments in the Spanish Empire
Spanish Colonial architecture in Peru
Dominican monasteries in Peru

es:Monasterio de Santa Rosa de Arequipa